Kim Byung-woo (born 1980) is a South Korean film director and screenwriter.

Personal life 
Kim majored in Theater & Film at Hanyang University.

Career 
Kim is known for making inventive and self-funded films.

In 2001, he made his first five-minute short film Cry on digital video in a shoestring budget.

In 2003, he made his feature debut when he was still a theatre and film student at Hanyang University. The film Anamorphic has the main character searching for a way out after passing through gates and doors into a shadowy netherworld. He self-funded the project at the cost of US$4,000.

In 2007, his second feature Written propelled his standing in Korean independent cinema to a new level. Written is a film within a film where his lead character was caught in a hellish predicament when his fate as a character in a script is being determined by others. The self-funded film was shot on high-definition video and cost only US$15,000 to make.

Filmography 
Cry (short film, 2001) - director 
Anamorphic (2003) - director, screenwriter, producer, editor 
Written (2008) - producer, director, screenwriter, editor
The Terror Live (2013) - director, screenwriter
Take Point (2018) - director, screenwriter

Awards 
2013 14th Busan Film Critics Awards: Best New Director (The Terror Live)
2013 22nd Buil Film Awards: Best New Director (The Terror Live)
2013 22nd Buil Film Awards: Best Screenplay (The Terror Live)
2013 34th Blue Dragon Film Awards: Best New Director (The Terror Live)

References

External links 
 
 
 

1980 births
Living people
South Korean film directors
South Korean screenwriters